Any fule kno is a deliberate childish misspelling, meaning "Even a fool knows (some fact)". It may refer to:

Nigel Molesworth, a fictional character who wrote in that style.
Any Fule Kno That, 1998 album track by Deep Purple.